Erik Wroldsen (born 19 March 1973 in Arendal, Norway) is a heavy metal drummer. His main band was the industrial metal band Red Harvest (band).

Erik has also played drums for Trivial Act and Decadence.

Discography 
Decadence
 DECADENCE (Demo) – 1990
 GUNSLINGER (Demo) – 1991
 DANCING ON THE EDGE OF DAWN     (Demo) – 1992

Trivial Act
 A GATHERING… of 8 Norwegian Prog. Metal Bands – 1995
 MINDSCAPE – 1997
 SILENT SAND OF DREAMS - 2022
 MYSTIC SIGNALS - 2022
 CHANGE - 2023

Red Harvest
 NEW RAGE WORLD MUSIC – 1998
 Cold Dark Matter – 2000
 New World Rage Music – 2001
 Sick Transit Gloria Mundi – 2002
 Internal Punishment Programs – 2004
 Harvest Bloody Harvest (DVD) 18. September – 2006
 A Greater Darkness – 2007
 The Red Line Archives  – 2008
 Anarchaos Divine: The Trinity of the Soundtrack to the Apocalypse - 2014

Other
A NORWEGIAN TRIBUTE TO THE RAMONES (1 Song) – 2005

References

External links
 Official Red Harvest Site
 Official Red Harvest MySpace page
 Official Red Harvest FaceBook page
 Official Decadence MySpace page
 Official Decadence FaceBook page
 Red Harvest Official Relapse Records Band Page
 Red Harvest Official Season of Mist Records Band Page
 Red Harvest Official Nocturnal Art Records Band Page

1973 births
Living people
Norwegian heavy metal drummers
Male drummers
21st-century Norwegian drummers
21st-century Norwegian male musicians